Greatest is a 1990 compilation album by the rock group The Go-Go's from California, United States. The record, which represents the first best-of album by the Go-Go's, includes most of the hits and stand-out tracks from the band's first three studio albums, 1981’s Beauty and the Beat, 1982’s Vacation, and 1984‘s Talk Show, only omitting three minor hit singles, "He's So Strange," "This Old Feeling" and "Yes or No".

The collection does not include any new songs, except for a re-recording of the 1960s cover version of "Cool Jerk" (the 'original' version of the cover was already on the Go-Go's second album, Vacation), which was also released as the one single from the compilation, reaching #60 in the UK Singles Chart, in 1991, this way becoming the second Go-Go's song to ever enter the British charts (the third and highest UK hit from the band would eventually be "The Whole World Lost Its Head", peaking at #29, from their second Greatest Hits album, 1994 Return to the Valley of The Go-Go's).

A mint-green vinyl re-release of the album was released through Target in July 2020.

Track listing

Chart positions

Album

Singles

References

1990 greatest hits albums
The Go-Go's albums
I.R.S. Records compilation albums
Albums produced by Martin Rushent
Albums produced by Richard Gottehrer